Mina Ben-Zvi (1909-2000) was the first commanding officer of the Israeli Defense Forces’ Women's Corps.

Biography
Mina Ben-Zvi was born as Mina Rogozik in 1909 in Ukraine (Velyki Mezhyrichi, Rivne Oblast). In 1921 she moved with her family to Mandatory Palestine.  After completing her education, in 1933, at the age of 24, she joined the Haifa branch of the Haganah.

During the World War II, she was  among the first 66  women in Mandate Palestine to join the women's corps of the British Army.  She subsequently became as a commander  of a British unit  in Egypt with a rank of captain. When the 1948 war started she was appointed as the first commander in chief of the women's corps of Israeli Defense Forces. In 1953, she joined her husband Eliyahu Ben-Zvi on a diplomatic mission to Finland from 1953 to 1955.  Later she was appointed as Israel's  representative to  the UN Commission on the Status of Women (1956–1958).
  
In 1960 Golda Meir established Mount Carmel International Training Center in collaboration with  Ben-Zvi,  and Inga Thorsson, a Swedish diplomat, who later became Sweden's Ambassador to Israel. Ben-Zvi became the founding director of Mount Carmel International Training Center, and served as its director for a period of 25 years.

According to Heller, she worked "for advancing women's rights worldwide." She died in 2000.

References

1909 births
2000 deaths
 
Women in the military
Women in World War II
Israeli female military personnel
Israeli soldiers
Mandatory Palestine military personnel of World War II